Davao Occidental's at-large congressional district is the congressional district of the Philippines in Davao Occidental. It has been represented in the House of Representatives of the Philippines since 2016. It was previously included in Davao del Sur's 2nd congressional district from 1987 to 2010. It is currently represented in the 19th Congress by Claude Bautista of the Hugpong ng Pagbabago (HNP).

Representation history

Election results

2016

2019

2022

See also 

 Legislative districts of Davao Occidental

References 

Congressional districts of the Philippines
2013 establishments in the Philippines
At-large congressional districts of the Philippines
Congressional districts of the Davao Region
Constituencies established in 2013